Giana Gutiérrez (born 30 May 1976) is a Colombian former professional tennis player.

Biography
Gutiérrez represented Colombia in the Federation Cup from 1992 to 1994, in a total of seven ties. This included one World Group tie, against Germany in Frankfurt in 1994, which she featured in as a doubles player.

At the 1998 Central American and Caribbean Games in Maracaibo, Gutiérrez won a bronze medal for Colombia in the women's singles competition.

Most of her professional career was played on the ITF Circuit, but she did appear in the Copa Colsanitas, a WTA Tour tournament in Bogotá. She fell in the final round of the singles qualifying draw in 1998 and 1999, then featured in the doubles main-draw in 2000, reaching the quarterfinals.

ITF Circuit finals

Singles: 2 (0–2)

Doubles: 15 (3–12)

See also
 List of Colombia Fed Cup team representatives

References

External links
 
 
 

1976 births
Living people
Colombian female tennis players
Competitors at the 1998 Central American and Caribbean Games
Central American and Caribbean Games bronze medalists for Colombia
Central American and Caribbean Games medalists in tennis
20th-century Colombian women
21st-century Colombian women